Perry Township is one of the fourteen townships of Shelby County, Ohio, United States.  The 2000 census found 1,128 people in the township.

Geography
Located in the eastern part of the county, it borders the following townships:
 Salem Township – north
 Miami Township, Logan County – northeast
 Adams Township, Champaign County – southeast
 Green Township – south
 Orange Township – southwest
 Clinton Township – west

A small portion of the city of Sidney, the county seat of Shelby County, is located in far western Perry Township, and the unincorporated communities of Pasco and Pemberton lie in the eastern part of the township.

Name and history
Perry Township was established around 1824. It is one of twenty-six Perry Townships statewide.

Government
The township is governed by a three-member board of trustees, who are elected in November of odd-numbered years to a four-year term beginning on the following January 1. Two are elected in the year after the presidential election and one is elected in the year before it. There is also an elected township fiscal officer, who serves a four-year term beginning on April 1 of the year after the election, which is held in November of the year before the presidential election. Vacancies in the fiscal officership or on the board of trustees are filled by the remaining trustees.

References

External links
County website

Townships in Shelby County, Ohio
Townships in Ohio